Jennifer Robinson (born 1981) is an Australian human rights lawyer and barrister with Doughty Street Chambers in London. Before coming to the Bar, she founded the Bertha Justice Initiative and is Director of Legal Advocacy for the Bertha Foundation in London. She is also an adjunct lecturer in Law at the University of Sydney Law School.

Robinson is best known for her role as a long-standing member of the legal team defending Julian Assange and WikiLeaks. She has also provided legal assistance to activists from West Papua.

Education
Robinson grew up in Berry, New South Wales, and attended Bomaderry High School. She then attended the Australian National University, where she graduated with a double degree in Law and Asian Studies, specialising in international law, Indonesia and South East Asia. She was awarded the University Medal in Law and was a Distinguished Scholar in Asian Studies. During her time at the ANU, she also completed studies at the Universitas Gadjah Mada (UGM) in Yogyakarta, Indonesia. She speaks Indonesian and Malay.

She was a Rhodes Scholar at the University of Oxford, where she attended Balliol College and graduated with a Bachelor of Civil Law with Distinction and a Master of Philosophy in International Public Law.

Career
Robinson was called to the Bar in 2016 and joined Geoffrey Robertson QC's Doughty Street Chambers, having known Robertson since her period at Oxford University in the mid-2000s. They outlined the case for an Australian Bill of Rights, as well as a legal opinion on crimes against humanity in Iran.

From 2009, she worked at the London law firm of Finers Stephens Innocent, where her practice was largely media defence, freedom of information and free speech litigation, acting for clients such as The New York Times, CNN, Associated Press and Bloomberg News. She also provided international human rights advice, including on humanitarian issues in post-conflict Iraq, extraordinary rendition and international criminal law. Robinson has engaged in strategic free speech litigation before the UK Supreme Court, the European Court of Human Rights. She has challenged obscenity convictions in Indonesia.

With Geoffrey Robertson QC, she acted in the first application before the UK Supreme Court, popularly known as the "alphabet soup" case, where they were successful in overturning reporting restrictions in anti-terrorist asset freezing cases in Mohammed Jabar and Others v HM Treasury [2010] UK SC 1.  She also acted in the first application, before the UK Supreme Court intervened on behalf of media defence organisations in the Max Mosley case before the European Court of Human Rights.

Instructed by Richard Dawkins, Christopher Hitchens and Sam Harris in 2009, she worked with Robertson on establishing the legal case that the Pope and the Vatican were responsible for crimes against humanity, as a result of widespread child sex abuse within the Catholic Church.  This case was later submitted to the ICC Prosecutor by the Centre for Constitutional Rights.

Robinson advised The New York Times during its phone-hacking investigations in London, including its story about the extent of involvement of Andy Coulson, who became the press adviser to the UK Prime Minister, David Cameron. The newspaper's stories claimed phone hacking was not isolated to a few rogue journalists and that knowledge and approval of the practice went right up the chain to News of the World editors. Robinson began advising Julian Assange and WikiLeaks in October 2010.

In late 2011, she became Director of Legal Advocacy advising the Bertha Foundation, with the task of creating and developing a global human rights and public interest law program. The program aims to support organisations practicing public interest law and to promote movement lawyering, and provide a clear career track into public interest and human rights law for young lawyers.

In May 2013, Robinson spoke at TEDx Sydney. Entitled "Courage is Contagious", her speech to an audience of over 2,500 informed about human rights issues and the political situation in West Papua through the lens of exiled leader Benny Wenda. 

More recent cases include acting for the BBC World Service to take action against Iran for the persecution of BBC Persian staff and their families, the first time in BBC history that BBC journalists have appealed to the UN for their protection, representing Amber Heard in relation to Johnny Depp's 2021 British defamation case against The Sun newspaper, and acting with French counsel for a group of NGOs from around the world in challenging the cross-jurisdictional impact of the right to be forgotten in Google v CNIL before the Conseil d'État and the European Court of Justice.

Defending Wikileaks and Assange
Robinson began advising WikiLeaks in October 2010, and she remains a member of his legal team under the direction of Baltasar Garzon. She has defended Assange in extradition proceedings in London and advised WikiLeaks through the publication of secret American diplomatic cables and the Chelsea Manning proceedings.

Lawyers Rights Watch wrote a complaint to the US Government in 2010, "alarmed by actions of US State Department Legal Advisor Harold Hongju Koh" that had put Robinson "in jeopardy and interfere with the right of her client Julian Assange, to be represented". In correspondence with Robinson and Assange that was leaked to the press, the United States Department of State made a number of unsubstantiated claims against both Assange and Robinson, as his lawyer, which were denounced by whom? as being in breach of the UN Basic Principles on the Role of Lawyers, the Universal Declaration of Human Rights Defenders and the American Bar Association Model Rules of Professional Conduct. Lawyers Rights Watch denounced that "Mr. Koh [had] invited upon Ms Robinson the denunciation and possible violence already directed at her client. The intention to put Ms Robinson’s personal and professional safety at risk and to interfere with Mr. Assange’s right to be legally represented is inescapable."

Robinson said Koh's actions were "inappropriate" and a public retraction was requested. No answer was ever received.

Robinson has continued to be publicly critical of the US Government's handling of the Chelsea Manning case, as well as the investigation into Assange and WikiLeaks and, in particular, the secrecy surrounding both. She worked with the Center for Constitutional Rights in applying for greater public access to the Manning proceedings and confronted US Attorney-General Eric Holder about his legacy and his plans to prosecute Assange in early 2012. In response to her article about her encounter with Holder, American journalist Michael Hastings was critical of press reporting on Assange's case, said that Robinson "has to do a reporter’s job as well". In June 2013, The New York Times confirmed the existence of the grand jury investigation into Assange and WikiLeaks.

West Papua advocacy
In 2002, Robinson worked as a volunteer at the Institute for Advocacy and Study of Human Rights (Elsham), a human rights organisation in West Papua, Indonesia until her stay was cut short by the first Bali bombings.

Robinson also acts as a lawyer for the West Papuan independence leader Benny Wenda,  having helped him gain political asylum in the UK in 2003, and has toured with him to the US, Australia, New Zealand and Papua New Guinea. She is also the co-founder of International Lawyers for West Papua.

Awards and appointments
In 2008 she was one of thirty lawyers named by the UK Attorney General as a National Pro Bono Hero. In 2013 she was named the inaugural Young Alumni of the Year by the Australian National University. 
Robinson is on the Executive Committee of the Commonwealth Law Association.

References

External links

 Jennifer Robinson's Twitter account
 Bertha Foundation
 Jennifer Robinson's Doughty Street Chambers profile

1981 births
Living people
21st-century Australian lawyers
Australian National University alumni
Alumni of Balliol College, Oxford
Australian Rhodes Scholars
WikiLeaks
Human rights lawyers
Place of birth missing (living people)
Australian women lawyers